Yeliar Elias Castro (born December 3, 1987 in Panama City, Panama) is a minor league baseball pitcher who also played for Panama in the 2009 World Baseball Classic.

Minor league career
Castro was signed by the Atlanta Braves in 2004, and began his professional career in 2005 with the GCL Braves. He went 0-2 with a 9.82 ERA that season. In 2006, he again pitched for the GCL Braves, improving to 1-2 with a 5.32 ERA. He split the 2007 season between the Danville Braves and GCL Braves, going a combined 2-2 with a 3.82 ERA. In 2008, he pitched for the Rome Braves, going 5-6 with a 4.98 ERA. He began 2009 with Rome as well.

World Baseball Classic
In the 2009 World Baseball Classic, Castro appeared in one game, allowing three earned runs in two innings of work. All three runs came off of a home runs Miguel Olivo.

References

1987 births
Living people
Sportspeople from Panama City
2009 World Baseball Classic players
Panamanian expatriate baseball players in the United States
Gulf Coast Braves players
Danville Braves players
Rome Braves players
Myrtle Beach Pelicans players
Mississippi Braves players
Lynchburg Hillcats players
Baseball players at the 2011 Pan American Games
Pan American Games competitors for Panama